Joël Zwarts (born 26 April 1999) is a Dutch professional footballer who plays as a forward for ADO Den Haag, on loan from the  club Jahn Regensburg.

Club career
Born in Capelle aan den IJssel, Zwarts played youth football for VV Hillegersberg, VV Nieuwerkerk, Sparta Rotterdam and SBV Excelsior before joining Feyenoord in the summer of 2017. On 31 January 2019, he joined FC Dordrecht on loan until the end of the season. He made his debut for the club a day later in a 3–3 Eerste Divisie draw with Jong Ajax. On 24 June 2019, he returned to Excelsior on a three-year contract.

On 15 July 2021, Zwarts signed for 2. Bundesliga side Jahn Regensburg. On 14 July 2022, he returned to the Netherlands and joined ADO Den Haag on loan.

International career
Zwarts has played for the Netherlands at under-19 level. He is also eligible to represent Suriname at international level, since his mother is from Suriname.

References

External links
 

1999 births
Living people
People from Capelle aan den IJssel
Footballers from South Holland
Dutch footballers
Association football forwards
Sparta Rotterdam players
Feyenoord players
FC Dordrecht players
Excelsior Rotterdam players
SSV Jahn Regensburg players
ADO Den Haag players
Eerste Divisie players
2. Bundesliga players
Netherlands youth international footballers
Dutch sportspeople of Surinamese descent
Dutch expatriate footballers
Expatriate footballers in Germany
Dutch expatriate sportspeople in Germany